Pietro Guerra (born 28 June 1943) is a retired Italian road cyclist. Competing as amateur in the 100 km team time trial, he won an Olympics silver medal in 1964 and two world titles, in 1964 and 1965, finishing third in 1966. Then he turned professional and rode the Tour de France in 1968–1972, winning one stage in 1971.

Major results

1968
Vuelta a España:
Winner stage 6
1970
Coppa Bernocchi
Cronostafetta (with Gianni Motta and Felice Gimondi)
GP Cemab
1971
 national track pursuit champion
Tour de France:
Winner stage 5
1972
Giro della Romagna
 national track pursuit champion
1973
Sverige Cup
Stockholm

References

External links 

1943 births
Living people
Italian male cyclists
Italian Tour de France stage winners
Italian Vuelta a España stage winners
Cyclists at the 1964 Summer Olympics
Olympic cyclists of Italy
Olympic silver medalists for Italy
Cyclists from the Province of Verona
Olympic medalists in cycling
Medalists at the 1964 Summer Olympics
UCI Road World Champions (elite men)